Remus John Lupin is a fictional character in the Harry Potter book series written by J. K. Rowling. He first appears in Harry Potter and the Prisoner of Azkaban as the new Defence Against the Dark Arts professor. Lupin remains in the story following his resignation from this post, serving as a friend and ally of the central character, Harry Potter. In the films, he is portrayed by David Thewlis as an adult, and James Utechin as a teenager.

Fictional character biography 
Lupin is a half-blood, born, according to the series, to wizard Lyall Lupin and his Muggle wife Hope Howell on March 10, 1960. He was bitten by the vicious werewolf Fenrir Greyback when he was a small child, and became infected with lycanthropy; the condition being incurable, he was doomed to live his life as a werewolf. Lupin and his parents feared he would be unable to attend Hogwarts, but headmaster Albus Dumbledore allowed him to enrol—provided certain protective measures were taken. A house was built in Hogsmeade with a secret passage leading to it from under the Whomping Willow. Lupin was smuggled into and confined in this house for his monthly transformations. The transformation from human to werewolf is difficult and painful, and if the creature is isolated, it will become frustrated and harm itself if unable to attack. The villagers mistook Lupin's howling as extremely violent ghosts. The house was dubbed "the Shrieking Shack" and became known as the most haunted building in Britain. Although it was never actually haunted, Dumbledore promoted this rumour to discourage curious villagers from exploring. It eventually became the Marauders' secret hangout when they achieved complete Animagi transformations.

When Lupin started Hogwarts, his condition was kept secret, but James Potter, Sirius Black and Peter Pettigrew deduced the truth in their second year. By their fifth year, they secretly (and illegally) learned how to become Animagi to keep Lupin company during his transformations. His lycanthropy was not transmittable to them in their Animagus forms, nor was he a threat to them while they were animals. Additionally, James and Sirius' Animagi (a stag and a large dog) were large enough to control a werewolf. His friends nicknamed him "Moony" for his condition. When Severus Snape became curious about where Lupin disappeared to each month, Black played a prank on him in their sixth year (although Sirius, James and Peter hated Snape, Lupin claimed he had no reason to hate him until their sixth year). Sirius told Snape where Lupin went every month, although he neglected to mention he was a werewolf and knew Snape could be killed if he approached Lupin in his transformed state. Snape, determined to get them in trouble, followed Sirius' directions. When James learned what Sirius did, he stopped Snape before he reached the Shrieking Shack, saving his life. Snape, however, had seen Lupin in werewolf form and was sworn to secrecy by Dumbledore. Snape never forgave Sirius and believed James' only motive in foiling the plan was to avoid expulsion from Hogwarts.

In his fifth year, Lupin was made a prefect, although he had trouble disciplining James and Sirius. He did not become Head Boy, however. In an interview, J. K. Rowling linked this to Lupin's desire to be liked, "because he's been disliked so often." Lupin's main failing is, "he's always so pleased to have friends, so he cuts them an awful lot of slack." In Order of the Phoenix, Sirius said Lupin was the "good boy," and Rowling says he was the "mature" one. According to Sirius, Lupin did not participate in his and James' bullying (of Snape, in particular), but Lupin regrets never having told them to stop. He is also one of the co-creators of the Marauder's Map, which later falls into Harry Potter's ownership.

Lupin loathes and fears his monthly transformations: when he faces boggarts, they take the form of a globular full moon. These transformations became less severe in Harry Potter and the Prisoner of Azkaban, when the Wolfsbane Potion provided by Snape allowed him to have some control over them, and to retain his mind. It is shown that Lupin wears brown colored New & Lingwood brand shoes in Harry Potter and the Prisoner of Azkaban when packing.

Lupin was a member of the original Order of the Phoenix.

Appearances

Harry Potter and the Prisoner of Azkaban
Professor Lupin first appeared in Harry Potter and the Prisoner of Azkaban, in which he taught Defence Against the Dark Arts at Hogwarts School of Witchcraft and Wizardry. He is first seen on the Hogwarts Express, asleep, and "looked as if one good curse would be able to finish him off". However, when Dementors appeared in the train, Lupin finally wakes up "holding what seemed to be a handful of flames". There is evidence to suggest that Lupin is a more powerful wizard than he lets on. While on the train during Prisoner of Azkaban, he summons fire without a wand (wandless magic being difficult to perform) and holds it in the palm of his bare hand. Later, in Order of the Phoenix, he is the only fighter besides Dumbledore who was not wounded, killed or knocked unconscious in the battle at the Department of Mysteries.  This could be an indication of controlled wandless magic, something very few characters have been seen to do in the Harry Potter universe. At the end of the year, Severus Snape, furious over Sirius Black's escape and his resultant loss of the Order of Merlin promised to him by Cornelius Fudge, made public that Lupin was a werewolf, whereupon Lupin resigned in anticipation of the public outcry against a werewolf teaching at Hogwarts. During his tenure, he gave Harry private lessons in casting the Patronus Charm, the only known means of defence against Dementors. His students, excepting a few from Slytherin, held him in extremely high regard and loved his hands-on teaching style. Harry and his friends considered him to have been their best Defence teacher.

Until the climax of Prisoner of Azkaban, Lupin believed Sirius Black was guilty of murdering 12 Muggles, betraying Lily and James Potter, and killing Peter Pettigrew. He eventually discovered the truth — that Sirius was innocent, and the very much alive Peter was the traitor. He helped Sirius to explain the truth to Harry, Ron and Hermione in the Shrieking Shack, and they all confronted Peter, who had been disguised for the previous twelve years as Ron's pet rat, Scabbers. However, Remus had forgotten to take the Wolfsbane potion, which prevented him from becoming violent while a werewolf. While Harry, Ron, and Hermione were distracted by Lupin, Peter assumed his Animagus form and escaped.

Harry Potter and the Order of the Phoenix 
Lupin reappears as an Order of the Phoenix member in Harry Potter and the Order of the Phoenix, but his role in the book is smaller than in Prisoner of Azkaban.

In Prisoner of Azkaban, Lupin is described as having "light brown hair" that is greying, and he wears shabby, patched clothing. In Order of the Phoenix, he has a pale face with premature lines. Because there are few employment opportunities for werewolves, as most in the wizarding world are prejudiced against them out of fear of the violent transformations, Lupin depends primarily on the kindness of others for support. When additional anti-werewolf laws are passed by the Ministry of Magic under Dolores Umbridge's direction in Order of the Phoenix, Lupin becomes nearly unemployable.

Lupin joins the newly reformed Order of the Phoenix in the fifth book and is part of the advance guard who escorts Harry from the Dursley family home in the book's opening chapters. Lupin lives in Grimmauld Place, the Order of the Phoenix headquarters with Sirius Black, but does not stay there often as he is usually sent on secret tasks for the Order. Later, he participates in the battle at the Department of Mysteries where he duels Lucius Malfoy. He came out unscathed while Lucius was bound by invisible ropes by Dumbledore.

Harry Potter and the Half-Blood Prince 
As in Harry Potter and the Order of the Phoenix, Lupin's role is small when compared to that in Harry Potter and the Prisoner of Azkaban. In Half-Blood Prince, he is working undercover as a spy amongst his fellow werewolves, who are under the leadership of the werewolf Fenrir Greyback, who bit Lupin as a child, and joined forces with Voldemort. Remus admits to Harry that due to prejudice in the wizarding world, he has found the werewolves' siding with Voldemort hard to counter, as the Dark Lord offers them more freedom than they are currently allowed.

At the end of the book, it is revealed that Nymphadora Tonks has fallen in love with Remus (Remus is 13 years older than Tonks). He resisted becoming involved with her because of the risks from his being a werewolf, and he said he is, "too old, too poor, and too dangerous," for her. However, the two are seen holding hands in one of the book's last scenes.

Harry Potter and the Deathly Hallows
Lupin appears in Deathly Hallows as even more tired-looking and anxious than before. He takes part in the Order's retrieval of Harry from Privet Drive and just prior to their departure, Tonks reveals that she and Remus were married recently. However, on various occasions he does not appear to be happy but rather tense.

Further into the book, Remus stumbles upon the trio hiding at Grimmauld Place and offers his assistance to help complete whatever task Dumbledore assigned them. A heated argument between Harry and Lupin over his motives for wanting to join them results in the revelation that Tonks is now pregnant; he believes his marriage to Tonks has made her an outcast, believing even her own family is disgusted by their alliance, and the unborn child, to whom he feels guilty for potentially passing on his lycanthropy, would be better off without him. Hermione tries to assure him that a child could never think that of his father; but Harry, who lost his own father (and godfather) at such a young age, and also does not want to put Remus in danger, criticises him for abandoning his family, going so far as to call him a coward. Lupin attacks Harry with his wand, smashing him into a wall, and leaves in a rage. Inevitably, he recognizes the truth in Harry's words and returns to Tonks' side.

Lupin remains active in the Order of the Phoenix throughout the year, while their increasingly desperate situation drives members such as Aberforth Dumbledore to quit. Loyalists with the wizarding wireless hear him run the casualty reports section on the pirate radio station Potterwatch under the pseudonym of Romulus (a tribute to the twins Romulus and Remus who were raised by wolves). Late in the year, Tonks gives birth to a healthy baby boy named Teddy Remus Lupin, who demonstrates Metamorphmagus tendencies instead of lycanthropy. Harry was named his godfather.

Lupin commands a group of defenders on the school grounds during the Battle of Hogwarts and is last mentioned to be duelling Antonin Dolohov. Both Lupin and Tonks die in combat, killed by Dolohov and Bellatrix Lestrange, respectively, leaving Teddy an orphan with Harry Potter as his godfather and Andromeda Tonks as his guardian. JK Rowling has since stated that she originally intended for both Lupin and Tonks to survive.

When Harry uses the Resurrection Stone, a younger-looking Lupin, along with Sirius, James, and Lily accompany Harry through the Forbidden Forest as he approaches Voldemort and an apparently imminent death. Harry apologizes to them all for their deaths, most especially to Lupin, for he would no longer have a chance to raise his son. Lupin tells Harry that he is sorry too, but also that his son will know what his father died for - a world in which his son would lead a happier life - and hopes that he will understand. The four spectres ward off Dementors as they travel through the forest, much like Patronuses, and are invisible to all but Harry. They disappear when Harry drops the Resurrection Stone as he goes to face the Dark Lord.

Rowling stated in an interview that Lupin and Tonks died to compensate for the last-minute reprieve she gave to Arthur Weasley when he survived a would-have-been fatal attack in Harry Potter and the Order of the Phoenix.
Rowling also stated that it was Antonin Dolohov who killed him.

Production

Actor David Thewlis was Prisoner of Azkaban director Alfonso Cuaron's first choice to play the role of Lupin. Thewlis had earlier auditioned for the role of Professor Quirrell in Harry Potter and the Philosopher's Stone but lost out to Ian Hart, who in turn encouraged Thewlis to take the role of Lupin. Thewlis appears as Lupin in Prisoner of Azkaban, Order of the Phoenix, The Half-Blood Prince, Harry Potter and the Deathly Hallows – Part 1, and finally in Harry Potter and the Deathly Hallows – Part 2. A teenaged version of Lupin briefly appears in Order of the Phoenix played by James Utechin during Snape's memories.

Name etymology 
This character's name is a clear example of Rowling's use of descriptive names for her characters, settings and other story elements. His first name, "Remus," is an allusion to Romulus and Remus, the legendary twin founders of Rome, who as infants were cared for by a she-wolf.  Lupin borrows the name of the other twin, "Romulus," as a nom de guerre in Book 7.

His last name, "Lupin," recalls the English word "lupine" (meaning "characteristic of or relating to wolves"), which in turn is derived from Latin lupus ("wolf"). In the folklore of northern France, lupin is also the term used to refer to a type of werewolf, noted for its shyness (in contrast to the more aggressive and violent loup-garou).  "Lupin" is also the name of a genus of flowering plant.

Reception
The fact that he's a werewolf and needs to take a potion to avoid hurting people for the rest of his life makes him a symbol of the consequences of prejudice and segregation, as well as society's often negative reaction to the ill and the disabled. Lupin is often listed as one of the best characters in the Harry Potter lore. IGN ranked Lupin as the 14th best character in the franchise stating, "An old friend of Harry's parents, he was able to give Harry personal, intimate insight into who they were that no one else had been able to provide." The character's death during the Battle of Hogwarts during Harry Potter and the Deathly Hallows is often regarded as one of the most emotional deaths of the series. Author J.K. Rowling has apologised for killing the character in the years following.

References

Works cited

External links 

Fictional werewolves
Literary characters introduced in 1999
Harry Potter characters
Fictional professors
Wizards in fiction
Fictional members of secret societies
Fictional schoolteachers
Fictional murdered people